Extremist Makeover is the fourth and final studio album by Australian punk rock band, 28 Days. It was released in October 2004 and peaked at number 31 on the Australian ARIA Charts

Track listing
(Tracks 11 to 27 are all silent)
(All tracks written by 28 Days)

Charts

Release history

References

2004 albums
Albums produced by Ulrich Wild
28 Days (band) albums